Paranthuridae is a family of crustaceans belonging to the order Isopoda.

Genera:
 Califanthura Schultz, 1977
 Colanthura Richardson, 1902
 Cruranthura Thomson, 1946
 Cruregens Chilton, 1882
 Paranthura Bate & Westwood, 1866
 Pseudanthura Richardson, 1911

References

Isopoda